Juniperus arizonica, the Arizona juniper, is a species of conifer in the family Cupressaceae, native to the Sonoran Desert of the southwestern United States and northwestern Mexico. It is a shrub or small tree, reaching .

References

arizonica
Flora of Arizona
Flora of the South-Central United States
Flora of Northwestern Mexico
Plants described in 2006
Flora without expected TNC conservation status